The 2008 West Virginia Mountaineers football team competed on behalf of West Virginia University during the 2008 NCAA Division I FBS football season. The team was coached by Bill Stewart, who took over after he led the Mountaineers to a 2008 Fiesta Bowl victory over the #3 Oklahoma Sooners as the interim head coach after the departure of former head coach Rich Rodriguez.  The team finished the season with a 9–4 record and a win over North Carolina in the Meineke Car Care Bowl.

Schedule

Coaching staff
Head coach Bill Stewart is the Mountaineers 32nd head coach in school history. He returns defensive coordinator Jeff Casteel and defensive line coach Bill Kirelawich. His new hirings are associate head coach, recruiting coordinator, fullback, and tight ends coach Doc Holliday, assistant head coach and safeties coach Steve Dunlap, running backs coach Chris Beatty, offensive line coach Dave Johnson, and cornerbacks coach David Lockwood. Jeff Mullen, former quarterbacks coach at Wake Forest, was announced as the offensive coordinator and quarterbacks coach. The receivers coach was named on January 29, Lonnie Galloway, the receivers coach from Appalachian State.

Spring Game
The Gold & Blue Spring Game was held on Saturday, April 19, 2008, at Mountaineer Field. A record crowd of over 25,000 fans attended as the Gold defeated the Blue 59–15. Kicker Pat McAfee was four-for-four on field goals with a long of 47 yards, and starting quarterback Pat White and backup Jarrett Brown both had touchdown passes. Brown also had a four-yard touchdown run and two backup kickers hit a field goal each. The defense recorded six sacks in total, and walk-on defensive back Darnell Christianled all corners with 3 passes deflected. Sophomore linebacker Pat Lazear had the only interception on the game off of a White pass. Backup runningback led all ballcarriers with 54 yards on 17 carries while sophomore Brandon Hogan led all receivers with 49 yards on 6 catches.

Recruiting class

Rankings

Game summaries

Syracuse

    
    
    
    
    

Noel Devine 18 Rush, 188 Yds

Auburn

Statistics

Team

Scores by quarter

Offense

Rushing

Passing

Receiving

Defense

Special teams

References

West Virginia
West Virginia Mountaineers football seasons
Duke's Mayo Bowl champion seasons
West Virginia Mountaineers football